Uladzimir Vasilyevich Yurchanka (Belarusian: Уладзімір Васілевіч Юрчанка; ; born 26 January 1989) is a Belarusian former footballer.

Career
Yurchenko made his debut for the U-21 national team on 9 September 2008, in a match against Latvia U21. He was part of the Belarus U21 side that participated in the 2009 UEFA European Under-21 Football Championship and made appearances in all three matches. On 12 August 2009, Yurchenko netted his first goal for the Belarus U21 team, opening the scoring against the Austria U21 in the 2–1 home win in a 2011 UEFA European Under-21 Football Championship qualifier. On 12 October 2010, Yurchenko netted twice to help his team to a 3–0 win against Italy U21, which secured qualification for the 2011 UEFA European Under-21 Football Championship.

On 2 November 2010, Yurchenko earned his first call-up to the senior team of his country, but was subsequently injured and withdrawn from the squad for the friendly match against Oman.

On 1 June 2011, Yurchenko was selected to take part in the 2011 UEFA European Under-21 Football Championship in Denmark, but was injured in a pre-tournament friendly and missed the competition. He was replaced by Aliaksandr Perepechka. Following his recovery from injury, he made the Belarusian squad for the 2012 Toulon Tournament and participated in all three group stage matches. He was also selected as part of the preliminary squad (including 43 players) for the 2012 London Olympics, but did not make the final cut of 22 (18 nominees + 4 reserves) footballers for the games.

Honours

Club 
Shakhtyor Soligorsk
Belarusian Cup winner: 2013–14

Individual 
CIS Cup top goalscorer: 2008

References

External links
 Player page on the official FC Saturn Moscow Oblast website 
 

1989 births
Living people
People from Mogilev
Belarusian footballers
Association football forwards
Belarusian expatriate footballers
Expatriate footballers in Russia
Russian Premier League players
FC Dinamo Minsk players
FC Saturn Ramenskoye players
FC Dnepr Mogilev players
FC Shakhtyor Soligorsk players
FC Torpedo-BelAZ Zhodino players
FC Dynamo Brest players
FC Orsha players
FC Gorki players
Sportspeople from Mogilev Region